Bismuth-209 (209Bi) is the isotope of bismuth with the longest known half-life of any radioisotope that undergoes α-decay (alpha decay). It has 83 protons and a magic number of 126 neutrons, and an atomic mass of 208.9803987 amu (atomic mass units). Primordial bismuth consists entirely of this isotope.

Decay properties
Bismuth-209 was long thought to have the heaviest stable nucleus of any element, but in 2003, a research team at the Institut d’Astrophysique Spatiale in Orsay, France, discovered that 209Bi undergoes alpha decay with a half-life of approximately 19 exayears (1.9×1019, approximately 19 quintillion years), over a billion times longer than the current estimated age of the universe. The heaviest nucleus considered to be stable is now lead-208 and the heaviest stable monoisotopic element is gold as the 197Au isotope.

Theory had previously predicted a half-life of 4.6 years. It had been suspected to be radioactive for a long time. The decay event produces a 3.14 MeV alpha particle and converts the atom to thallium-205.

Bismuth-209 will eventually form 205Tl if unperturbed:
 →  + 

If perturbed, it would join in lead-bismuth neutron capture cycle from lead-206/207/208 to bismuth-209, despite low capture cross sections. Even thallium-205, the decay product of bismuth-209, reverts to lead when fully ionized.

Due to its extraordinarily long half-life, for nearly all applications 209Bi can still be treated as if it were non-radioactive. Its radioactivity is much less than that of human flesh, so it poses no meaningful hazard from radiation.  Although 209Bi holds the half-life record for alpha decay, bismuth does not have the longest half-life of any radionuclide to be found experimentally—this distinction belongs to tellurium-128 (128Te) with a  half-life estimated at 7.7 × 1024 years by double β-decay (double beta decay).

The half-life of bismuth-209 was confirmed in 2012 by an Italian team in Gran Sasso who reported  years. They also reported an even longer half-life for alpha decay of bismuth-209 to the first excited state of thallium-205 (at 204 keV), was estimated to be 1.66 years. Even though this value is shorter than the measured half-life of tellurium-128, both alpha decays of bismuth-209 hold the record of the thinnest natural line widths of any measurable physical excitation, estimated respectively at ΔΕ~5.5×10−43 eV and ΔΕ~1.3×10−44 eV in application of the uncertainty principle of Heisenberg (double beta decay would produce energy lines only in neutrinoless transitions, which has not been observed yet).

Applications

Because primordial bismuth is entirely bismuth-209, bismuth-209 is used for all of the normal applications attributed to bismuth, such as being used as a replacement for lead, in cosmetics, in paints, and in several medicines such as Pepto-Bismol. Alloys containing bismuth-209 such as bismuth bronze have been used for thousands of years.

Synthesis of other elements

210Po can be manufactured by bombarding 209Bi with neutrons in a nuclear reactor. Only some 100 grams of 210Po are produced each year. 209Po and 208Po can be made through the proton bombardment of 209Bi in a cyclotron. Astatine can also be produced by bombarding forms of 209Bi with alpha particles. Traces of 209Bi have also been used to create gold in nuclear reactors.

209Bi has been used as a target for the creation of several isotopes of superheavy elements such as dubnium, bohrium, meitnerium, roentgenium, and nihonium.

Formation

Primordial

In the red giant stars of the asymptotic giant branch, the s-process (slow process) is ongoing to produce bismuth-209 and polonium-210 by neutron capture as the heaviest elements to be formed, and the latter quickly decays. All elements heavier than it are formed in the r-process, or rapid process, which occurs during the first fifteen minutes of supernovas. Bismuth-209 is also created during the r-process.

Radiogenic
Some bismuth-209 was created radiogenically as a result of the neptunium series decay chain. Neptunium-237 is an extinct radionuclide, but it can be found in traces in uranium ores because of neutron capture reactions. Americium-241, which is used in smoke detectors, decays to neptunium-237.

See also
Isotopes of bismuth
Primordial radionuclide
List of elements by stability of isotopes

Notes

References

Bismuth
Isotopes of bismuth